Guy Caspi is an America-based serial entrepreneur. He was one of the members of Israel Defense Forces’ elite cyber team.

Early life and career 
Capsi was born and raised in Rehovot, Israel. He holds BSc, MSc and MBA degrees in mathematics, Machine Learning and Business from various universities in Israel and USA.

Between 2005 and 2011, Capsi served as vice president and chief business officer in the Israel and US branches of Mavenir Systems(previously Comverse technology).

He has served has president and general manager at Comverse Technology (Verint Group).

Deep Instinct 
In 2015, Caspi along with Eli David and Nadav Maman, co-founded Deep Instinct, a company that applies artificial intelligence’s deep learning to cybersecurity.

References 

Living people
Year of birth missing (living people)
American people of Israeli descent